Chinese Culinary Institute (CCI)  formerly known in English as Chinese Cuisine Training Institute (CCTI), is a cooking school at Pok Fu Lam, Hong Kong. It is established and run by the Vocational Training Council of Hong Kong. It provides both full-time and part-time courses to beginners and practicing chefs in the industry who wish to obtain or upgrade their qualifications in Chinese cuisine.

See also
Vocational Training Council

References

External links
Chinese Culinary Institute
 

Cooking schools in Asia
Pok Fu Lam
Education in Hong Kong